2002–03 San Diego Toreros men's basketball team represented University of San Diego during the 2002–03 men's college basketball season. They received the conference's automatic bid to the NCAA Tournament where they lost in the first round to Stanford.

Schedule

|-
!colspan=9 style=| West Cost Conference tournament

|-
!colspan=9 style=| NCAA tournament

References 

San Diego
San Diego Toreros men's basketball seasons
San Diego
San Diego Toreros men's basketball
San Diego Toreros men's basketball